Haig Tchamitch (born 1951) is an American bridge player. Haig is an Armenian, who was born and grew up in Lebanon, lived for a few years in Canada and currently lives in Arizona.

Bridge accomplishments

Awards

 Herman Trophy (1) 1992

Wins

 North American Bridge Championships (1)
 Blue Ribbon Pairs (1) 1992 
 Grand National Teams (1) 2019

Runners-up

Notes

External links

American contract bridge players
Living people
1951 births